"Don't Quit Me Now" is a song co-written and recorded by American country music artist James House.  It was released in March 1989 as the first single from the album James House. It reached No. 25 on the Billboard Hot Country Singles & Tracks chart.  The song was written by House and Wendy Waldman.

Content
The song is about a single father pleading his wife not to leave him.

Chart performance

References

1989 singles
1989 songs
James House (singer) songs
Songs written by James House (singer)
Songs written by Wendy Waldman
Song recordings produced by Tony Brown (record producer)
MCA Records singles